Pownall may refer to:

People

Alan Pownall (b. 1986), British singer-songwriter
Capel Pownall (1869-1933), British Olympic archer
Charles Alan Pownall (1887-1975), US Navy rear admiral and 3rd Military Governor of Guam
David Pownall (b. 1938), British playwright and author
George Pownall (1755-1834), English politician in Lower Canada
Henry Royds Pownall (1887-1961), British World War II general
Leon Pownall (1943-2006), Welsh-born Canadian actor and director
Michael Graham Pownall (b. 1949), British public servant and former Clerk of the Parliaments
Nathalie Pownall (b. ? ), British actress
Thomas Pownall (1722-1805), British statesman and soldier
Thomas Pownall Boultbee (1818-1884), English clergyman and scholar

Other uses

Fort Pownall, Maine, United States
Pownall Hall, a former country house in Wilmslow, England

See also
 Pownal (disambiguation)
 Pwnall, to pwn all that one surveys